Viktor Nikolaevich Lebedev (born March 10, 1988, in Tomponskiy Ulus) is a Russian freestyle wrestler from the Sakha Republic, two time World Champion, multiple international tournaments winner. He won the gold medal at the 2015 Summer European Games in the Freestyle men's 57 kg weight category.

Lebedev competed out of the СSKA wrestling club in Krasnoyarsk, Russia. He is a three-time world medalist, including two title-winning performances in the 55 kg weight class at the 2010 and 2011 World Wrestling Championships. On 17 June 2015 he won the gold medal for wrestling in the 57 kilogram range at the 2015 European Games in Baku.

In October 2019, he was appointed Director General of Sakha Republic's state-owned fuel supply corporation, Sakhaneftegazsbyt (АО «Саханефтегазсбыт»).

On 19 December 2019, he caused physical harm to his deputy, Vladimir Strijak, breaking his nose and injuring various parts of his body. On 31 December 2019, he was officially charged with a crime by the regional court of Sakha Republic (Yakutia).

He is an ethnic Even.

See also
 List of World and Olympic Champions in men's freestyle wrestling
 Soviet and Russian results in men's freestyle wrestling

References

External links 
 

Living people
1988 births
Russian male sport wrestlers
People from Yakutsk
Wrestlers at the 2015 European Games
European Games medalists in wrestling
European Games gold medalists for Russia
World Wrestling Championships medalists
Olympic wrestlers of Russia
Wrestlers at the 2016 Summer Olympics
North-Eastern Federal University alumni
Even people
Sportspeople from Sakha
20th-century Russian people
21st-century Russian people
World Wrestling Champions